Hydatellaceae are a family of small, aquatic flowering plants. The family consists of tiny, relatively simple plants occurring in Australasia and India. It was formerly considered to be related to the grasses and sedges (order Poales), but has been reassigned to the order Nymphaeales as a result of DNA and morphological analyses showing that it represents one of the earliest groups to split off in flowering-plant phylogeny, rather than having a close relationship to monocots, which it bears a superficial resemblance to due to convergent evolution. The family includes only the genus Trithuria, which has at least 13 species, although species diversity in the family has probably been substantially underestimated.

Description 
Plants are submerged and emergent aquatic plants, rooted in the substrate below the water. They are tiny plants, just a few cm tall. Most species are ephemeral aquatics that flower in vernal pools when the water draws down, but several species are submerged perennials found in shallow lakes. The simple leaves are concentrated basally around a short stem. Individual species are cosexual (with several types of hermaphroditic conditions) or dioecious, and are either wind-pollinated (anemophilous) or self-pollinating (autogamous). Two predominantly apomictic species are also known. Flower-like reproductive units are composed of small collections of minute stamen- and/or pistil-like structures that may each represent very reduced individual flower, so that the reproductive units may be pseudanthia. The non-fleshy fruits are follicles or achenes.

Taxonomy 

The family was for many years assumed to be a close relative of the grasses and sedges and was even sometimes lumped under the poalean family Centrolepidaceae. Even as recently as 2003, the APG II system assigned Hydatellaceae to the grass order Poales in the commelinid monocots. However, research based on DNA sequences and morphology by Saarela et al. indicates that Hydatellaceae is the living sister group of the water lilies (Nymphaeaceae and Cabombaceae) and thus represents one of the most ancient lineages of flowering plants. Developers of earlier classifications were misled by the apparently reduced vegetative and reproductive morphology of these plants. As aquatic herbs, Hydatellaceae have environmental adaptations leading to derived characteristics that create a morphological similarity to the more distant taxon. Careful reanalysis of their morphological traits and comparisons with other so-called 'basal' angiosperms have supported this "dramatic taxonomic adjustment". This realignment is now recognized in the APG III and APG IV systems of classification.

The family now includes only the genus Trithuria, which in 2008 was re-defined to include the genus Hydatella.

References

External links 
 Hydatellaceae in L. Watson and M.J. Dallwitz (1992 onwards).,The families of flowering plants: descriptions, illustrations, identification, information retrieval. Version: 27 April 2006. https://web.archive.org/web/20060424062016/http://delta-intkey.com/
 Hydatellaceae photographs
 NCBI Taxonomy Browser

Monogeneric plant families
Nymphaeales
Angiosperm families